The Essaouira Agadir basin is a Meso-Cenozoic sedimentary basin located along the Atlantic margin of Morocco at its connection with the Western High Atlas.

References 

Geology of Africa